Adolf Hitler's Directives, or Führer Directives (Führerbefehle), were instructions and strategic plans issued by Adolf Hitler himself during the period of his rule over Germany. They covered a wide range of subjects, from detailed direction of the Armed Forces' operations during World War II, to the governance of occupied territories and their populations.

History 
The failure of the Nazis' attempted coup in 1923 made the Nazis realize that force was not always the best solution. The failure taught the Nazis that mass participation was necessary for them to achieve their goals. This participation required a legal basis in order to ensure that the public cooperated with the Nazis as a civic duty. 

Hitler put this lesson into practice as soon as he became Chancellor. First, he successfully convinced President Paul von Hindenburg to sign the Reichstag Fire Decree after the Reichstag fire incident in late February 1933, which essentially suspended the Constitution and most civil liberties in the country, which gave the Nazis free reign to eliminate their political opponents. After Hindenburg's death in 1934, Hitler had the Reichstag pass the Enabling Act, which not only merged the offices of the President and Chancellor into one office, but also gave the Chancellor the power to make laws without the approval of the Reichstag. This new power meant that the Nazis could now freely turn their political ideologies into national policy without worry of hindrances from existing legislation.

In practice, however, Hitler mainly used this power to secure personal control over the armed forces, particularly during the course of the war. He achieved this through issuing executive instructions called "Führer Directives", which were absolutely binding and were to be followed to the letter without question. The Directives superseded all other laws in the country, including the Constitution. However, they should not be confused with the Führer's Orders, issued late in the war, which were more precise and low-level, and could be written or oral. They were as binding as the more general Directives.

The Directives

References

 

 
Military plans
World War II documents